Halichoeres cosmetus, or the adorned wrasse, is a species of salt water wrasse the Indian Ocean from South Africa north to Yemen, including Socotra and east to western Thailand.

References

External links
 

cosmetus
Fish of Thailand
Taxa named by John Ernest Randall
Taxa named by Margaret Mary Smith
Fish described in 1982